Horace Herbert King (10 July 1883–1940) was an English footballer who played in the Football League for Blackpool.

References

1883 births
1940 deaths
English footballers
Association football forwards
English Football League players
Norwich City F.C. players
Blackpool F.C. players